Impostora is a Philippine television drama series broadcast by GMA Network. The series is loosely based on a 1993 Philippine film, Sa Isang Sulok ng mga Pangarap. Directed by Albert Langitan and Aya Topacio, it stars Kris Bernal in a dual role. It premiered on July 3, 2017 on the network's Afternoon Prime line up replacing Legally Blind. The series concluded on February 9, 2018 with a total of 160 episodes. It was replaced by The Stepdaughters in its timeslot.

The series is streaming online on YouTube.

Premise
Nimfa, a street vendor willingly undergoes surgery and facial reconstruction and is ordered to pretend to be Rosette. When Rosette returns to take Nimfa out of the picture, she will attempt to kidnap and murder Nimfa.

Cast and characters

Lead cast
 Kris Bernal as Nimfa del Prado-Saavedra / Rosario Margaret "Rosette" R. Cuevas

Supporting cast
 Rafael Rosell as Homer Saavedra
 Ryan Eigenmann as Jeremy Soriano
 Assunta de Rossi as Katrina "Trina" Saavedra
 Elizabeth Oropesa as Magdalena "Denang" Del Prado
 Aicelle Santos as Deedee Castro
 Vaness del Moral as Criselda "Crisel" Estanislao
 Leandro Baldemor as Jomari "Omar" Estanislao
 Sinon Loresca as Maximo "Maxi" Cuntapay
 Rita Daniela as Maureen Mendoza
 Yuan Francisco as Junic C. Saavedra
 Dayara Shane as Celine C. Saavedra
 James Blanco as Enrico "Eric" Espiritu
 Jervy "Patani" Daño as Juliet

Guest cast
 Djanin Cruz as Nancy Pineda
 Renz Fernandez as Mateo Reyes
 Aaron Yanga as Celso
 Jay Arcilla as Alvin
 Chariz Solomon as Fatima del Prado
 Jerald Napoles as Oliver del Prado
 Nanette Inventor as Remedios
 Ranty Portento as a sales agent
 Dex Quindoza as David
 Jaycee Parker as Esther
 Sophie Albert as Leticia
 Frank Garcia as Dante Cuevas
 Sheryl Cruz as Bettina "Betty" Romero
 Marc Abaya as Leo Corpuz
 Rob Sy as Emelito "Lito" Perez
 Sheena Halili as Rafaela "Riffy" Maniego / Rosette Cuevas
 Jade Lopez as Danica Santillan

Production
Due to high ratings, the show was given an extension up to February 9, 2018.

Ratings
According to AGB Nielsen Philippines' Nationwide Urban Television Audience Measurement People in television homes, the pilot episode of Impostora earned a 5.3% rating. While the final episode scored a 7.4% rating. The series had its highest rating on July 28, 2017 with an 8.8% rating.

Accolades

References

External links
 
 

2017 Philippine television series debuts
2018 Philippine television series endings
Filipino-language television shows
GMA Network drama series
Television series reboots
Television shows set in the Philippines